EasyReading font is a typeface designed to support all of the Latin-alphabet-based languages existing in the world, including those ranging from Turkish and Indonesian, to Swedish. It was created by Federico Alfonsetti with a Design for All methodological approach to help dyslectics in reading with less difficulty and to increase reading speed, while also being a highly-readable font for typical readers.

Currently, Easyreading is the only typeface in the world that has been certified by an independent scientific research project as "a valid compensatory tool for readers with dyslexia and at the same time a facilitating font for all types of readers" (translated from Italian).

As a hybrid typeface, it combines serif and sans-serif letter characteristics in order to facilitate reading without readers mistaking those often read incorrectly. It also has widely calibrated spacing (kerning) that is designed to facilitate legibility by being slightly greater than that of typical typefaces.

Erik Spiekermann claims that Easyreading is a copy of his ITC Officina Font.

References

External links
 Research stating what is written above   translation()
 Abstract from John Wiley & Sons Library: in September 2015, Dr. Bachmann presented the EasyReading research at the EAMHID (European Association for Mental Health) international conference held in Florence. The abstracts of the conference proceedings, including that of Dr. Bachmann, were published in the "Journal of Mental Disability Research" (Vol. 59, September 2015), published by John Wiley & Sons at the end of the same month. Content

Unicode typefaces
Dyslexia
Semi-serif typefaces
Typefaces and fonts introduced in 2009